The Kongo languages are a clade of Bantu languages, coded Zone H.10 in Guthrie's classification, that are spoken by the Bakongo:
 Beembe (Pangwa, Doondo, Kamba, Hangala), Ndingi, Kunyi, Mboka, Kongo, Western Kongo, Laari (Laadi), Vili, Yombe, Suundi

Languages
Glottolog, based on Koen Bostoen (2018, 2019), classifies two dozen languages of the Kongo language cluster as follows:
Kikongo language cluster
Hungan-Samba: Hungan, Samba
Nuclear cluster
Yaka-Suku: Suku, Yaka-Pelende-Lonzo
"Kikongoic"
Beembe
Kambakunyic Kikongo
Kamba-Kunyi: Kaamba, Kunyi
Kilaadic Kikongo 
Nuclear Northern Kikongo: Doondo, Laari, Suundi
Central-Southern Kikongo
Southeastern Kikongo
Eastern Kikongo
Southern Kikongo: Hungu-Pombo, Koongo-Kituba (Congo Kituba, DRC  Kituba, South-Central Koongo)
West Kikongo
San Salvador Kongo
Yombe
Vilic
Vili
Lumbuic
Lumbu, Bwisi
Ngubi; Punu - Vumbu (Vungu), Sangu - Sira - Barama

These are closest to Mbuun, Ngongo and Nsong-Mpiin.

References